The brown skua (Stercorarius antarcticus), also known as the Antarctic skua, subantarctic skua, southern great skua, southern skua, or hākoakoa (Māori), is a large seabird that breeds in the subantarctic and Antarctic zones and moves further north when not breeding. Its taxonomy is highly complex and a matter of dispute, with some splitting it into two or three species: Falkland skua (S. antarcticus), Tristan skua (S. hamiltoni), and subantarctic skua (S. lönnbergi). To further confuse, it hybridizes with both the south polar and Chilean skuas, and the entire group has been considered to be a subspecies of the great skua, a species otherwise restricted to the Northern Hemisphere.

Diet

It feeds on fish (often via kleptoparasitism), penguin chicks and other seabirds, small mammals, eggs and carrion.

Description
This is the heaviest species of skua and rivals the largest gulls, the great black-backed gull and glaucous gull, as the heaviest species in the shorebird order although not as large in length or wingspan. The latter is one of the highest colony mean body mass for any living species of shorebird.

A study in 2016 reported that brown skuas can identify individual human beings, possibly indicating high cognitive abilities.

Brown skuas have been noted for sometimes bonding with humans who live for extended periods in Antarctica, such as the Eastern Orthodox clergymen at Trinity Church, and engaging in playful or apparently mischievous behavior with them.

References

Further reading

External links
 Brown skua, subantarctic skua - Species text in The Atlas of Southern African Birds

brown skua
Birds of Antarctica
Birds of New Zealand
Birds of the Falkland Islands
Birds of Southern Africa
Birds of islands of the Atlantic Ocean
Fauna of the Prince Edward Islands
Fauna of Heard Island and McDonald Islands
Birds of subantarctic islands
brown skua
Taxa named by René Lesson
Taxobox binomials not recognized by IUCN